Bicyclus buea, the small black bush brown, is a butterfly in the family Nymphalidae. It is found in eastern Nigeria, Cameroon, Equatorial Guinea, Angola, the Democratic Republic of the Congo, Uganda, western Kenya and north-western Tanzania. The habitat consists of dense and sub-montane forests.

Both sexes are attracted to fermented fruit.

References

Elymniini
Butterflies described in 1912